Luther Airport  is a private use airport located one nautical mile (1.85 km) east of the central business district of Chittenango, a village in the Town of Sullivan in Madison County, New York, United States.

Facilities and aircraft 
Luther Airport has one runway with turf surfaces: 9/27 is 1,700 by 80 feet (518 x 24 m). For the 12-month period ending November 3, 2009, the airport had 2,550 general aviation aircraft operations, an average of 212 per month.

References

External links 
 Aerial image as of 3 May 1994 from USGS The National Map

Airports in New York (state)
Buildings and structures in Madison County, New York
Transportation in Madison County, New York